RUTACA Airlines (legally Rutas Aéreas C.A.) is an airline headquartered in Ciudad Bolívar, Venezuela with its home base at Tomás de Heres Airport and a hub at Simón Bolívar International Airport in Caracas.

History
RUTACA Airlines was founded by Evard Mares Bianchi on February 6, 1974, and began operating non-scheduled cargo and passenger flights with small aircraft. It currently operates scheduled and charter services throughout the country. 

The airline's operations suffered gravely during the 2017 Venezuelan constitutional crisis, including suspending flights between key routes.

Destinations

, RUTACA Airlines serves the following destinations:

Fleet

Current fleet

The RUTACA Airlines fleet includes the following aircraft (as of December 2022):

Former fleet
RUTACA Airlines formerly operated the following aircraft:
6 Antonov An-2TP
1 Beechcraft C-45 Expeditor
1 Britten-Norman BN-2 Islander
17 Cessna 206
1 Cessna 207
4 Cessna 208B Grand Caravan
1 Convair CV-340
1 Convair CV-440
8 Douglas C-47A Skytrain
1 Douglas DC-3C
6 Embraer EMB 110 Bandeirante

Accidents and incidents
On June 5, 1987, a Britten-Norman BN-2 Islander (registration YV-230C) was disarmed in flight over the area of Upata, Bolívar state. All 10 occupants on board died.

On January 25, 2001, RUTACA Airlines Flight 225, a Douglas DC-3 (registered YV-244C) crashed shortly after taking off from Ciudad Bolívar, killing all 20 passengers and four crew members.

On October 16, 2008, a Boeing 737-200 (registered YV162T) landed on runway 28R at Simón Bolívar International Airport following a domestic flight from Puerto Ordaz. After touchdown, the airplane swerved to the left. The nose came to rest on the runway embankment.

On February 15, 2009, a Cessna 208B Grand Caravan (registered YV1950) overran the runway at Guasdualito Airport following a domestic flight from Las Flecheras Airport. The airplane sustained damage to the propeller and underside of the fuselage.

On July 27, 2010, a Boeing 737-200 (registered YV169T) made an emergency landing at Ciudad Guayana international airport following a domestic flight from Ciudad Bolivar after problems in engine number one.

See also
List of airlines of Venezuela

References

External links

 Official website

Airlines of Venezuela
Airlines established in 1974
Ciudad Bolívar
Venezuelan companies established in 1974